Lucas Mayer (born 16 February 1983) is an Austrian handball player for Bregenz Handball and the Austrian national team.

References

1983 births
Living people
Austrian male handball players
People from Bregenz
Sportspeople from Vorarlberg